Trashing may refer to:
 Garbage picking, particularly if used to obtain documents or confidential information
 Information diving
 Vandalism

See also 
 Thrashing (disambiguation)